Vakilabad-e Pain Jam (also Romanized as Vakīlābād-e Pā’īn Jām; also known as Vakīlābād) is a village in Zam Rural District, Pain Jam District, Torbat-e Jam County, Razavi Khorasan Province, Iran. At the 2006 census, its population was 409, in 104 families.

References 

Populated places in Torbat-e Jam County